David Neilson (born 13 March 1949) is an English actor. He is best known for his role as cafe owner Roy Cropper in the long running ITV soap opera Coronation Street, which he has played since 1995.

Early life
Neilson was born in Loughborough, Leicestershire, and enrolled at the Central School of Speech and Drama at the age of 20. He worked in various jobs at the same time, including as a gas fitter, ice cream salesman and a barman.

Career
His television roles include Z-Cars, Young at Heart, Mike in a single episode of Survivors (BBC), Edgar in DH Lawrence's Sons and Lovers adapted by Trevor Griffiths (BBC), Blue Heaven by Frank Skinner, as Millington in the TV movies of the Charlie Resnick novels, Bergerac, Casualty, Boys from the Blackstuff, Secret Army and Heartbeat. He appeared briefly in EastEnders in the early 1990s, and in a celebrity edition of Stars in Their Eyes as Roy Orbison. He also starred in the British drama Chimera.

In addition he has appeared in two Mike Leigh films: Life Is Sweet and Secrets & Lies.
On radio in 2009, Neilson appeared in God Bless Our Love, an uplifting, romantic comedy about a priest and a nun who fall in love and leave their orders to marry and begin a new life together.

Personal life 
Neilson is a lifelong Leicester City supporter, regularly running Alan Birchenall's charity race around the King Power Stadium to raise money for awareness for prostate cancer, in memory of former Leicester City player Keith Weller. He is also a Labour Party supporter, supporting the party at the 2011 Oldham East and Saddleworth by-election.

Awards and nominations

References

External links
 

1949 births
Living people
English male soap opera actors
English male film actors
People from Loughborough
Male actors from Leicestershire
Labour Party (UK) people